Stickman Soccer is a videogame series for Android and iOS by Austrian studio Djinnworks first released in 2014.

Games
Stickman Soccer Classic (2013)
Stickman Soccer 2014 or Stickman Soccer '14 (2014)
Stickman Soccer 2016 or Stickman Soccer '16 (2016)
Stickman Soccer 2018 or Stickman Soccer '18 (2018)

References

Video game franchises introduced in 2013
 2013 video games
2014 video games
2016 video games
2018 video games
Association football video games
Video games with cross-platform play
Android (operating system) games
IOS games
Video games developed in Austria